Aberdeen F.C. competed in the Scottish Football League Division One and Scottish Cup in season 1922–23.

Overview

Aberdeen finished in fifth place out of 20 in Scottish Division One, their highest finish since 1911. A new ground record for Pittodrie Stadium was set in October when 27,000 spectators attended a game against Rangers which finished 0–0. In the Scottish Cup, a club record victory was achieved over Peterhead in the third round. Aberdeen won 13–0. Andy Rankine was the club's top scorer this season with 17; fourteen in the league and three in the cup.

Results

Scottish Division One

Final standings

Scottish Cup

Squad

Appearances & Goals

|}

References

Aberdeen F.C. seasons
Aberdeen